An interactive electronic technical manual (IETM) is a portal to manage technical documentation. IETMs compress volumes of text into just CD-ROMs or online pages which may include sound and video, and allow readers to locate needed information far more rapidly than in paper manuals. IETMs came into widespread use in the 1990s as huge technical documentation projects for the aircraft and defense industries.

History
In the United States, in the late 1970s, the US Military began to look at other ways to produce technical manuals. With the introduction of computer technology it was theorized that moving technical manuals to an electronic format would obtain a cost savings, allow better integration with other logistics systems and improve usability of the technical material.

Research was performed in the 1970s and 1980s by all branches of the US military to obtain information on what the goals should be for the electronic technical manuals. Early research was conducted at the Army Communicative Technology Office at Ft. Eustis, the Air Force Human Resources Laboratory (now called Armstrong Laboratory) at Wright-Patterson Air Force Base, and the David Taylor Research Center (now called Naval Surface Warfare Center, Carderock Division) in Bethesda, Maryland. Programs developed by the Navy, Navy Technical Information Presentation System (NTIPS) and the Air Force, Computer-based Maintenance Aid System (CMAS), were used along with user surveys, technological analysis and design studies to come up with the basic concepts for IETMs. Based on field tests with technicians maintaining military equipment, the tests found that performance was greatly improved and dramatic improvement occurred for inexperienced technicians. One questionnaire found that 90% of the technicians preferred electronic manuals and found them easier to use.

Other examples of the improvements from IETMs included:
 Navy - 100% of the technicians, experience and inexperienced, found a fault when using electronic material compared to 58% when the technicians used paper manuals
 Air Force - 100% fault isolation for experience and inexperienced technicians using electronic material compared to 75% success rate when using paper

Because of the positive results, the Department of Defense identified the need for standardization of the IETM development. In 1987 a joint military and commercial group was formed consisting of the Office of the Secretary of Defense Computer-assisted Acquisition and Logistics Support (OSD CALS) and Aerospace Industries Association (AIA). This group developed concepts for IETM authoring, IETM presentation and data interchange which were used as the basis for standard development. In 1989 the US Navy, Air Force and Army formed an ad-hoc group to determine the best way to create standards for IETMS. Input from the use of NTIPS and CMAS, later renamed Integrated Maintenance Information System(IMIS), were used along with input from the CALS Industry Steering Group (ISG) Paperless Technical Manual Committee, the Navy A-12 Program, The Air Force ATF Program, and the Army PMDE Program's IETM Style Guide as a starting point for a working group for IETM standards. The group came out with the first formally issued set of standards in 1992. By 1994, Senior R&D Engineer Michael Weldon, working on behalf of LORAL Corporation, developed a demonstration White Paper IETM describing the use of an IETM utilizing an eyeglass Monitor interfaced with a portable belt mounted CD Player for hands free use by technicians in the field, i.e. as when working on a tower 60 feet AGL.

The Tri-Service group came up with three standards: 
  MIL-M-87268. Manuals, Interactive Electronic Technical: General Content, Style, Format, and User-Interaction Requirements For.
  MIL-D-87269. Data Base, Revisable: Interactive Electronic Technical Manuals, For The Support Of.
  MIL-Q-87270. Quality Assurance (QA) Program: Interactive Electronic Technical Manuals (IETMs) and Associated Technical Information, Requirements For.

The Tri-Service Group also came up with a roadmap that went through to 1997 for revision of the standards and the creation of documentation explaining the standards.

Classes
The functionality of IETMs systems is broken down into six classes.
But these classes are more like points in a spectrum of features with
most real-world IETM products falling somewhere in between two classes.

 Type I
 Class 1 - This IETM class follows the structure and format of a printed book, with indexes and table of contents that are hyperlinked into the content of the document. This might be a scanned book with some links added.
 Class 2 - This format includes more hyperlinks than Class I, such as figures, tables and section references. A hyperlinked PDF document is the typical example. The document would be marked up with XML.
 Class 3 - The difference between Class II and Class III is analogous to the difference between PDF book and a web site. The book structure is discarded; instead the document is structured more freely following the logic of the content. The document can still be printed but it won't necessarily match the presentation on the screen. Hyperlinking throughout the document is expected. The document would be marked up with XML.
 Type II
 Class 4 - This class now expects the data to be stored in a relational database, obtaining benefits of data integrity and removal of data redundancy. Relationships in the content that are presented as hyperlinks, are mapped directly to relations in the database schema. Redundancy in the data that exists in earlier classes should be removed. The sequence of presentation is also different from earlier classes. There is no longer the concept of a static page. Content can change dynamically based on users navigation and input through  the content; the content may now be user specific. It is no longer possible to print a linear format of the document.
 Class 5 - In this class the documentation is now integrated with expert systems that may influence the display of content. For example, the IETM system may aggregate data from a large number of users input, feed that to the expert system that analyzes it and then the result gets fed back to the user through the IETM system.  An analogy might be Google search, where search results are improved based on analysis of large data sets of previous queries entered by users.
 Class 6 - A network model database was used.  Dynamic multi-destination hyperlink system was used. Included system-oriented layers and troubleshooting, assembly and disassembly aspects.  The Advanced Interactive Electronic Technical Manual (A-IETM 1992) was an R&D Augmented Reality (AR) version of this system designed to help to guide the standards used in the mark-up of the documentation - the idea being a UI-independent data stream.  Maintenance in the field and training were both benefits of this system.  Created for, and by, NAWCAD/IST.

IETM Functionality Matrix
Due to the imprecise nature of the generic descriptions used in the class and level description of IETMs, IETMs are now defined using a Functionality Matrix. IETMs can have many different features and the Functionality Matrix  is used as a checklist of which features are required for a particular IETM. This checklist more precisely defines what functionality an IETM has, and allows clearer communication between an IETM developer and the IETM customer. Classes and levels of IETMS are no longer regarded as acceptable descriptors of IETMs.

The IETM functionality matrix was first developed by the US Aerospace Industries Association (AIA) Product Support Committee. It is used in most US military technical data specifications as well as S1000D, the international IETM standard.

See also 
 S1000D
 MDDV(tm) - Multipurpose Digital Data Viewer
 IETD - Interactive Electronic Technical Documentation (German)

References

Technical communication tools